Karıncalı  is a town in Orhaneli district of Bursa Province,  Turkey. The population of the town was 2058  as of 2012. Although the present name of the town Karıncalı means "with ant" the original name Karın refers to maternal brothers. The settlement was founded by  10 families of Turkmen Kayı tribe  after Orhan of Ottoman Empire captured Orhaneli in early 14th century. In 1994, the settlement was declared a seat of township .

References

External links
Images

Populated places in Bursa Province
Towns in Turkey
Orhaneli District